Rüştü is a Turkish name, a form of the name Rushdi of Arabic origin, and may refer to:

Given name

First name
 Rüştü Erdelhun (1894–1983), Turkish army general 
 Rüştü Hanlı (born 1997), Turkish football player
 Rüştü Nuran (born 1976), Turkish basketball referee and surgeon
 Rüştü Pasha (1872–1926), officer of the Ottoman Army and general of the Turkish Army 
 Rüştü Reçber (born 1973), Turkish football player
 Rüştü Sakarya (1877–1951), Turkish army general

Middle name
 İsmail Rüştü Aksal (1911–89), Turkish civil servant and politician
 Tevfik Rüştü Aras (1883–1972), Turkish politician
 Mehmet Rüştü Başaran (born 1946/47), Turkish businessman
 Fatin Rüştü Zorlu (1910–1961), Turkish diplomat and politician

See also
 Rushdi

Turkish masculine given names